Emmanuel Okyere Boateng (born 23 May 1996) is a Ghanaian footballer who plays as a striker for Rio Ave.

Club career

Rio Ave
Born in Accra, Boateng joined Rio Ave in 2013, after impressing on a trial, from hometown club Charity Stars FC. Initially assigned to the youth setup, he made his professional debut on 31 July 2014, coming on as a second-half substitute for Yonathan Del Valle in a 1–0 away win against IFK Göteborg for the season's UEFA Europa League.

Boateng made his Primeira Liga debut on 17 August 2014, starting in a 2–0 home win against Vitória de Setúbal. His first goal in the category occurred on 1 September, as he scored the last in a 4–0 home routing of Boavista.

Moreirense
On 7 July 2015, Boateng and his Rio Ave teammate Ernest Ohemeng made a permanent move to fellow league team Moreirense. Mainly used as a substitute during his first season, he started to feature more regularly during his second.

Boateng was also regularly used in the Taça da Liga, netting a brace in a 3–1 home success over Benfica on 26 January 2017. Three days later, he replaced Roberto in the final, a 1–0 win against S.C. Braga; it was Moreirense's first ever national title.

Boateng scored his first league double on 30 April 2017, in a 2–2 away draw against Arouca.

Levante
On 16 August 2017, Boateng signed a four-year deal with La Liga side Levante UD.

On 13 May 2018, he scored first career hat-trick against champions Barcelona. Levante won the match 5–4, ending the possibility of an unbeaten season for Barcelona.

Dalian Professional
On 20 February 2019, Boateng signed with Chinese Super League side Dalian Professional (then Dalian Yifang).

Return to Rio Ave
In 2022, Boateng left Dalian to rejoin Rio Ave.

International career
He was part of the Ghana national under-20 football team, who played the 2015 FIFA U-20 World Cup in New Zealand. He scored one goal in the competition on 5 June 2015, in a 1–0 win against Panama. On 30 May 2018 he made his senior appearance for the Black Stars. He marked his debut with a goal when he scored a penalty in the 51st minute of the game.

Career statistics

Club

International goals
Scores and results list Ghana's goal tally first.

Honours
Moreirense
Taça da Liga: 2016–17

References

External links

1996 births
Living people
Footballers from Accra
Ghanaian footballers
Association football forwards
Primeira Liga players
La Liga players
Chinese Super League players
Rio Ave F.C. players
Moreirense F.C. players
Levante UD footballers
Dalian Professional F.C. players
Ghana international footballers
Ghana under-20 international footballers
Ghanaian expatriate footballers
Ghanaian expatriate sportspeople in Portugal
Ghanaian expatriate sportspeople in Spain
Ghanaian expatriate sportspeople in China
Expatriate footballers in Portugal
Expatriate footballers in Spain
Expatriate footballers in China
Ghana youth international footballers
Charity Stars F.C. players